Comedy Nation was a British sketch comedy television programme that premiered at midnight 9 January 1998 on BBC Two. The first series consisted of 13 episodes, each containing 30 sketches. Each episode of the first series cost £29,000 to produce.

References

External links

Comedy Nation at The Mighty Boosh web site

1990s British television sketch shows
1998 British television series debuts
1999 British television series endings
BBC television comedy
BBC television sketch shows